A relatively common motif in speculative fiction is the existence of single-gender worlds or single-sex societies. These fictional societies have long been one of the primary ways to explore implications of gender and gender-differences in science fiction and fantasy.  Many of these predate a widespread distinction between gender and sex and conflate the two.

In the fictional setting, these societies often arise due to elimination of one sex through war or natural disasters and disease. The societies may be portrayed as utopian or dystopian, as seen in pulp tales of oppressive matriarchies.

Women-only worlds
There is a long tradition of female-only places in literature and mythology, starting with the Amazons and continuing into some examples of feminist utopias. In speculative fiction, women-only worlds have been imagined to come about, among other approaches, by the action of disease that wipes out men, along with the development of technological or mystical method that allow women to reproduce parthenogenically.  The societies may not necessarily be lesbian, or sexual at all—a famous early sexless example being Herland (1915) by Charlotte Perkins Gilman.

In literature
During the pulp era, matriarchal dystopias were relatively common, in which women-only or women-controlled societies were shown unfavourably. In John Wyndham's Consider Her Ways (1956), male rule is shown as being repressive of women, but freedom from patriarchy is only possible in an authoritarian caste-based female-only society. Poul Anderson's "Virgin Planet" depicted a world where five hundred castaway women found a way of reproducing asexually—but the daughter is genetically identical to the mother—with the result that eventually the planet has a large population composed entirely of "copies" of the original women. In this woman-only world, human males are considered mythical creatures—and a man who lands on the planet after centuries of isolation finds it difficult to prove that he really is one.

Themyscira, the home island of DC Comics' Amazon superheroine Wonder Woman, was created by William Moulton Marston to allegorize the safety and security of the home where women thrived apart from the hostile, male-dominated work place. It is governed by "Aphrodite's Law", which states: "Penalty of death to any man attempting to set foot on Themyscira."

British sci-fi writer Edmund Cooper explored the subject in several of his novels, including Five to Twelve (1968) and Who Needs Men (1972).

James Tiptree Jr., a woman writing under a male pseudonym, explored the sexual impulse and gender as two of her main themes; in her award-winning "Houston, Houston, Do You Read?" (collected in Her Smoke Rose Up Forever), she presents a female-only society after the extinction of men from disease. The society lacks stereotypically "male" problems such as war and crime, but only recently resumed space exploration. The women reproduce via cloning and consider men to be comical.

Such worlds have been portrayed often by lesbian or feminist authors; their use of female-only worlds allows the exploration of female independence and freedom from patriarchy. 

Women-only society are often shown to be utopian by feminist writers. Several influential feminist utopias of this sort were written in the 1970s; the most often studied examples include Joanna Russ's The Female Man, Suzy McKee Charnas's Walk to the End of the World and Motherlines.  Female-only societies may be seen as an extreme type of a biased sex-ratio, another common theme in science fiction.

Some lesbian separatist authors have used female-only societies to additionally posit that all women would be lesbians if having no possibility of sexual interaction with men, as in Ammonite (1993) by Nicola Griffith. The enormously influential The Female Man (1975) and "When It Changed" (1972) by Joanna Russ portrayed a peaceful agrarian society of lesbians who resent the later intrusion of men, and a world in which women plan a genocidal war against men, implying that the utopian lesbian society is the result of this war.

A Door into Ocean is a 1986 feminist science fiction novel by Joan Slonczewski. The novel shows themes of ecofeminism and nonviolent revolution, combined with Slonczewski's own knowledge in the field of biology. The water moon Shora is inhabited by women living on rafts who have a culture and language based on sharing and a mastery of molecular biology that allows them to reproduce by parthenogenesis.

An example of a contemporary dystopian female world is Y: The Last Man, which features one male human and monkey who survive a cataclysmic event killing all other males.

In Elizabeth Bear's Carnival (2006), a matriarchal, primarily lesbian society called New Amazonia has risen up on a lush planet amidst abandoned alien technology that includes a seemingly inexhaustible power supply. The Amazonian women are aggressive and warlike, but also pragmatic and defensive of their freedom from the male-dominated Earth-centric Coalition that seeks to conquer them. Distrustful of male aggression, they subjugate their men, a minority they tolerate solely for reproduction and labor.

Kameron Hurley's The Stars are Legion (2017) is set somewhere on the outer rim of the universe, into a mass of decaying world-ships known as the Legion is traveling in the seams between the stars. There are no males anywhere in the Legion. Women are given birth by, and live inside, biological entities called Worlds. Women living inside the Worlds become pregnant without sex and give birth to various biological beings and spare parts which are used to keep the Worlds, and thus their civilization, alive and functioning.

Jonathan Frame's Schrödinger’s Elephant (2018) is a collection of five novellas exploring overpopulation and the idea humanity is programmed to maintain its population levels sub-consciously through violence, war and so on.  Each novella deals with a moment in human history as women violently revolt against men to eradicate human males, the remaining female population learning to live in the world they have engineered.

In other media 
The 1984 Polish film Sexmission deals with a dystopian women-only society where all men have died out. Women reproduce through parthenogenesis, living in an oppressive feminist society, where apparatchiks teach that women suffered under males until males were removed from the world.

Lithia, Episode 17 of the fourth season of the 1995 remake of The Outer Limits, features a man who was cryogenically frozen and awakens in a world populated only by women. Men died due to a war and a subsequent virus that affected males. They reproduce by artificial insemination using frozen sperm left over from the time when there were men.

The 2010 German vampire film We Are the Night explores the idea of feminist separatism. In the film, the female vampire committed genocide against male vampire somewhere at the end of the 1800s after many of them already had been killed by humans, as they were "too careless" and risked exposure to humanity. The female vampires agreed amongst each other never to turn another man into a vampire.

In the Mass Effect universe, the asari are a monogender-pansexual species, outwardly appearing as 'female' and using female pronouns and descriptors for the benefit of dual-gendered species. With their reproductive system based on the 'melding' of nervous systems rather than the exchange of genetic material, asari are capable of procreating with any sex, gender or species but with the resultant offspring being always asari.

Men-only worlds
Men-only societies are much less common. Joanna Russ suggests this is because men do not feel oppressed, and therefore imagining a world free of women does not imply an increase in freedom and is not as attractive.

The earliest mention of an all-male society seems to be the myth of the creation of man by the titan Prometheus, as recorded in Hesiod's 8th century BCE Theogony. To punish Prometheus for his trick at Mecone, Zeus hid the fire from men, but Prometheus managed to steal it back and restore it to mankind. This infuriated Zeus even more, who sent the first woman, Pandora, to live with mankind. Hesiod writes, "From her is the race of women and female kind: of her is the deadly race and tribe of women who live amongst mortal men to their great trouble, no helpmeets in hateful poverty, but only in wealth."

According to ancient Greek records there were the Gargareans, an all-male tribe on the northern foothills of the Caucasus mountains that copulated annually with the Amazons in order to keep both tribes reproductive. The Amazons kept the female children, and gave the males to the Gargareans. The Ancient Greek chronicler Strabo mentioned that both the Gargareans and Amazons had migrated from Themiscyra.

In the 2nd century CE, Lucian of Samosata tells in his fictional work A True Story that the inhabitants of the Moon, the Selenitans, are all males, completely unaware of the female gender. As adults they marry man to man and have children, always male, begotten in their legs, in the manner of Zeus begetting Dionysus in his thigh. There are a kind of men among them called Dendritans, who generate children by cutting and planting the right testicle in the earth, from which a flesh tree grows bearing a fruit the size of a cubit, from which the baby son is harvested.

Cordwainer Smith's 1964 short story The Crime and the Glory of Commander Suzdal portrays a society in which all of the women have died out. A. Bertram Chandler's A Spartan Planet (1969) features the men-only planet Sparta, which is dedicated to the values of militarism loosely modeled upon the ancient Greek city state of Sparta.

Ethan of Athos (1986) by Lois Bujold, inspired by the real world men-only religious society of Mount Athos, shows a world in which men have isolated their planet from the rest of civilization to avoid the "corrupting" effect of women. Children are grown in uterine replicators, using ova derived from tissue cultures; the novel's plot is driven by the declining fertility of these cultures. The titular "unlikely hero" is gay obstetrician Dr. Ethan Urquhart, whose dangerous adventure alongside the first woman he has ever met presents both a future society where homosexuality is the norm and the lingering sexism and homophobia of our own world.

The main character in Frank Herbert's The White Plague loses his family to terrorist action in Ireland.  He responds by developing a biological weapon that kills only women.  He warns the world to isolate Ireland to avoid spread of the disease.  World leaders do not take the threat seriously and the disease is spread around the world.

The parodic film Gayniggers from Outer Space follows a group of intergalactic homosexual black men as they exterminate the female population of the Earth, eventually creating a utopic Male-only world.

The anime and manga series Saber Marionette features a planet in the 22nd century colonized by humans from Earth whose only survivors of the travel were males. Called Terra 2, for three centuries the new world was inhabited solely by men who reproduced through cloning technology until they were able to create female androids name marionettes, creations that, while they serve their purpose, operate without sapience, emotion, or free will.

The science fiction comedy show Lexx, in the episode "Nook", featured a planet peopled entirely by monks of a strange repressive order who were forced to spend their lives copying books they could not read. They were not aware that women or other forms of society existed.

The gay fantasy book series Regelance by J. L. Langley depicts a world where men are able to reproduce via replicative technology. While there are still women amongst the lower classes, who reproduce in the traditional manner, there are none among the upper classes which the series focuses on.

The science fiction show The Orville featured a character Bortus played by Peter Macon who is a member of an exclusively masculine society where female births are very rare. In the show's second episode, Bortus' female child was surgically turned male against his wishes.

In DC Comics, the Gargareans are an all-male tribe of undead Greek warriors, revived by Zeus to serve as male counterparts to the Amazons of Themyscira, living on the Island of Thalarion forbidden to women; their king is the specially created homosexual wonder warrior Achilles Warkiller. A year earlier, DC Comics created the male Amazons of Elysium, which are the female-dominated Earth-11 gender-reversed version of the Amazons of Themyscira; their champion is Prince Dane of Elysium, the Wonder Man.

Ungendered worlds

Still other worlds are presented without a local concept of gender or after gender has been made obsolete. Marge Piercy's Woman on the Edge of Time features a post-apocalyptic world populated by gender-neutral people.  In Ann Leckie's Imperial Radch, the most prominent space empire of humanity no longer divides its population by gender, but some nations in other star systems still do.

Sexless or hermaphroditic worlds
Some other fictional worlds feature societies in which everyone has more than one sex, or none, or can change sex. For example:

Ursula K. Le Guin's The Left Hand of Darkness (1969) depicts a world in which individuals are neither "male" nor "female" but at different times have either female or male sexual organs and reproductive abilities. Similar patterns exist in Greg Egan's novel Schild's Ladder and his novella Oceanic or in Storm Constantine's book series Wraeththu about an oogamous magical race that arose from mutant human beings.

John Varley, who also came to prominence in the 1970s, also often writes on gender-related themes. In his "Eight Worlds" suite of stories (many collected in The John Varley Reader) and novels, for example, humanity has achieved the ability to change sex at a whim. Homophobia is shown to initially inhibit uptake of this technology, as it engenders drastic changes in relationships, with homosexual sex becoming an acceptable option for all.

In Barry B. Longyear's 1979 novella Enemy Mine and its 1985 film adaptation, the Dracs are an intelligent hermaphroditic reptilian race from the planet Dracon that reproduces asexually.

In the Culture series of novels and stories by Iain M. Banks, humans can and do relatively easily (and reversibly) change sex.

Sex segregation
Segregation of the sexes is another relatively common trope of speculative fiction—physical separation can result in societies that are essentially single-sex, although the majority of such works focus on the reunification of the sexes, or otherwise on links that remain between them, as with Sheri S. Tepper's The Gate to Women's Country, David Brin's Glory Season and Carol Emshwiller's Boys. Even an episode of Duckman tried this.

In the Neanderthal Parallax novels by Robert J. Sawyer, a Neanderthal visitor from a parallel world where Homo sapiens became extinct and Neanderthals became the dominant species arrives on our world. The Neanderthal society is sexually segregated, with men and women interacting for only a few days each month, and reproduction being consciously limited to ten-year intervals. 

Sometimes the segregation is social, and men and women interact to a limited extent. For example, when overpopulation drives the world away from heterosexuality in Charles Beaumont's short story The Crooked Man (1955), first published in Playboy, homosexuals oppress the heterosexual minority and relationships between men and women are made unlawful.

See also

 Gendercide 
 Androcide 
 Femicide 
 Misogyny 
 Misandry 
 Monastic community of Mount Athos 
 Arcadia (utopia)
 Feminist utopia
 Gender in speculative fiction
 Hypergamy
 LGBT themes in speculative fiction
 Sex and sexuality in speculative fiction

References
Notes

Bibliography

External links
 List of female/lesbian worlds at lesbiansciencefiction.com

 
Gender in speculative fiction